City Centre ( in Finnish,  in Swedish) is a ward of Turku, Finland, also known as Ward 1. The ward's boundaries correspond approximately to those of the city's central business district, and it borders all the other wards of Turku except for Maaria-Paattinen (Ward 9).

The City Centre ward is the largest ward in Turku, with a population of 51,471 and an annual population change of -0.29%. 7.70% of the ward's population are under 15 years old, while 20.19% are over 65. The ward's linguistic makeup is 88.96% Finnish, 8.49% Swedish, and 2.55% other.

Districts
The ward consists of 22 districts, which is more than any other ward in Turku. Five of the districts are divided between City Centre and another ward.

Notes
 The districts of Kähäri and Vätti are divided between City Centre and Kuninkoja.
 The district of Pihlajaniemi is divided between City Centre and Uittamo-Skanssi.
 The district of Pitkämäki is divided between City Centre, Kuninkoja, and Naantalintie.
 The district of Raunistula is divided between City Centre and Tampereentie.

See also 
Districts of Turku
Wards of Turku

Wards of Turku